The Aero Car was a British 5/7 hp (533 W) flat twin-engine cyclecar manufactured from 1919 to 1920 by the Aerocar Engineering Company in Clapton, London.  The engine was an air-cooled flat-twin built by Blackburne and the gearbox was a Sturmey-Archer. The body had a bullnose radiator and pointed tail.

See also
List of car manufacturers of the United Kingdom

References

Vintage vehicles
Cyclecars
Defunct motor vehicle manufacturers of England
Motor vehicle manufacturers based in London

Cars introduced in 1919